The cost of raising a child varies from country to country.

The cost of raising a child is usually determined according to a formula that accounts for major areas of expenditure, such as food, housing, and clothing. However, any given family's actual expenses may differ from the estimates. For example, the rent on a home does not usually change when the tenants have another child, so the family's housing costs may remain the same. In other cases, the home may be too small, in which case the family might move to a larger home at a higher cost. The formula may also account for inflation, as prices are constantly changing, and it will inadvertently affect how much it costs to raise a child.

Developing countries
According to Globalissues.org, "Almost half the world—over three billion people—live on less than US$2.50 a day." This statistic includes children.  The calculation of the cost to raise a child in developing countries is difficult, since families often do not operate with currency, but barter or trade to provide for their children. It is argued that in developing areas the balance between earnings and costs of having children is changing, because the mean number of children per couple in many developing areas has decreased dramatically, especially in Asia, North Africa and the Near East. According to a 2020 report, 356 million children – 17.5 per cent
– live in extreme poverty (less than
US$1.90 a day).

Argentina 
Argentina's INDEC provides a breakdown of minimum costs per person in household, known as the "canasta básica total", this metric doesn't measure the average cost, but the minimum cost (poverty line) and is published monthly. All values are per "equivalent adult".

Data for June 2022. Exchange rate 1 US dollar is 135,7500 ARG (July 2022). This aggregates to around $ 41501.40 from birth to 18 years old.

India 

Cost break up is as follows:

Note: Estimate assumes cost of birth, but doesn't consider any major illness in child.

Developed Countries

United Kingdom 
Child Poverty Action Group’s annual cost of a child report looks at how much it costs families to provide a minimum socially acceptable standard of living for their children. The 2022 report shows the cost of raising a child from birth to 18 years old as £157,562 for a couple family or £208,735 for a single parent/guardian,

United States 
Based on a survey by the U.S. Department of Agriculture, the table below shows the estimated Average Spending on Children by Families. The data comes from the Consumer Expenditure Survey by the U.S. Department of Labor, conducted from 2005-06. The figures have been updated to 2011 dollars using the Consumer Price Index.  However, some dispute the numbers as being biased high for political reasons (e.g., Texas A&M University Finance Professor H. Swint Friday: "The numbers, reported by the U.S. Department of Agriculture, are outrageously misleading. Often government statistics are produced for political objectives that cause the research methodology to be biased toward finding the highest dollar amount to support the objective.").

These figures from the USDA go up to age 18, and do not include any college or university education. Nor does it offer any spending estimates if the child remains in the home as a dependent after the age of 18.

Both tables are for the United States overall, not based on any specific region in the country.

All numbers are in US dollars.

All numbers are in US dollars.

See also

Only child
Child care
Child support
Childfree
Cost of living
Demographic economics
Family economics
Family planning
Family values
Single parent
Middle-class squeeze

References

External links
"Raising that '07 baby will cost $204,060 in U.S." - from Reuters, retrieved August 5, 2012.
"Cost of raising children not as high as government would have you believe" - from caller.com, retrieved March 31, 2013.
"Cost of Raising Children in the US" - from Globe Life Insurance, retrieved September 11, 2013

Parenting
Family
Demographic economics